Mohamed Zeki Amdouni (born 4 December 2000) is a Swiss professional footballer who plays as a forward for Basel in the Swiss Super League on loan from Lausanne-Sport.

Career
Amdouni is a youth product of Servette, Meyrin, and Étoile Carouge. He began his career with Étoile Carouge. before moving to Stade Lausanne Ouchy in the Swiss Challenge League in 2019. On 9 June 2021, he transferred to Lausanne-Sport in the Swiss Super League. He made his professional debut with Lausanne-Sport in a 2–1 Swiss Super League loss to FC St. Gallen on 24 July 2021.

On 24 June 2022, Amdouni joined Basel's first team for their 2022–23 season under head coach Alexander Frei signing a two-year loan with an option for the club to buy. After playing in two test games, in each of which he had scored a goal, Amdouni played his domestic league debut for his new club in the away game in the Schützenwiese on 16 July 2022 as Basel drew 1–1 with Winterthur. Amdouni scored his first goal for the club on 28 August in the away game in the Letzigrund against Zürich as Basel won 4–2.

International career
Amdouni was born in Switzerland to a Turkish father and Tunisian mother. He represented the Switzerland U20s, before switching to represent Turkey U21 in May 2019. That same month, he again switched over to the Switzerland U21s.

He was called up by the senior Switzerland squad for the 2022–23 UEFA Nations League matches against Czech Republic, Portugal (twice) and Spain on 2, 5, 9 and 12 June 2022, respectively. He made his debut on 27 September 2022 in a Nations League game against the Czech Republic, substituting Ruben Vargas in the 79th minute.

References

External links
 
 
 SFL Profile
 SFV U20 profile
 SFV U21 Profile

2000 births
Living people
Footballers from Geneva
Swiss men's footballers
Switzerland under-21 international footballers
Switzerland international footballers
Turkish footballers
Turkey under-21 international footballers
Swiss people of Turkish descent
Swiss people of Tunisian descent
Turkish people of Tunisian descent
Association football forwards
FC Stade Lausanne Ouchy players
FC Lausanne-Sport players
Étoile Carouge FC players
FC Basel players
Swiss Super League players
Swiss Challenge League players